Ruxandra Dragomir and Inés Gorrochategui were the defending champions of the Warsaw Cup by Heros, a tennis tournament, but did not compete in 1998.

Karina Habšudová and Olga Lugina won in the final 7–6(7–2), 7–5 against Liezel Horn and Karin Kschwendt.

Seeds
Champion seeds are indicated in bold text while text in italics indicates the round in which those seeds were eliminated.

 Sabine Appelmans /  Silvia Farina (first round)
 Cătălina Cristea /  Eva Melicharová (quarterfinals)
 Meike Babel /  Wiltrud Probst (semifinals)
 Karina Habšudová /  Olga Lugina (champions)

Draw

External links
 1998 Warsaw Cup by Heros Doubles Draw
 Main draw (WTA)

Warsaw Open
1998 WTA Tour